Kuialnyk Estuary Kuyagnyk formerly the Andriyivsky Liman is an estuary of the Velykyi Kuialnyk on the northwest coast of the Black Sea, one of the group of Odessa estuaries, located north of Odessa.

General characteristics

Kuialnytsky Liman (from the Crimean. Kuyanlık - thick), also Kuyalnyk, formerly the Andriyivsky Liman - is an estuary on the northwest coast of the Black Sea, one of the group of Odessa estuaries, located north of Odessa.

Below the Big Kuyalnik river
Area, depending on the water level, ranges from 52–60 km².  Length - 28 km, width more than 3 km. The average depth is about 1 m. The volume is about 52 million m³. It is separated from the sea by a sandy Kuyalnytsky-Hajibeysky crossing up to 3 km wide. The Big Kuyalnik River flows into the estuary. The lowest point of Ukraine is located near the Kuyalnytsia estuary: 5 meters below sea level.

On the southeast coast of the estuary there is Kuyalnytsky mud resort, on the banks of the estuary - beaches. The water temperature reaches 28-30 °C in summer.

Once on the place of Kuyalnytsia estuary was located the mouth of the river Big Kuyalnik. Over time, the mouth turned to the gulf of the Black Sea, and then due to the deposition of river and sea sand formed an overflow, and thus the gulf turned into an estuary. Separation from the sea took place in about the fourteenth century, much later than the branch located near the Hajibeyan estuary. This can be judged at least by the fact that Kuyalnik's overflow is three times narrower than that of Hajibey.

The water level in the estuary and its salinity are regularly changed. Long-standing observations have shown that between 1878 and 1968 salinity in the estuary ranged from 29 to 269 ‰. During the years with high salinity, salt precipitated at the bottom of the estuary. In the dry years, when the Great Kuyalnik River dried up, the area of the reservoir decreased almost twice.  Twice, in 1907 and 1925, seawater was launched to save the estuary from drying out.

See also
 Dead Sea
 Mud bath

References
 Starushenko L.I., Bushuyev S.G. (2001) Prichernomorskiye limany Odeschiny i ih rybohoziaystvennoye znacheniye. Astroprint, Odessa, 151 pp. (in Russian)
 North-western Black Sea: biology and ecology, Eds.: Y.P. Zaitsev, B.G. Aleksandrov, G.G. Minicheva, Naukova Dumka, Kiev, 2006, 701 pp.

Saline lakes of Europe
Estuaries of the Black Sea
Estuaries of Ukraine
Deserts of Ukraine
Balneotherapy
Landforms of Odesa Oblast